Marcelo Oliveira Ferreira (born 29 March 1987) is a Brazilian former professional footballer who played as a left back, defensive midfielder or central defender.

Career
Marcelo Oliveira started his professional career on loan at Paulista in 2006. He made his professional debut against Juventude he helped Timão to win the match.

In June 2007 he scored his 1st senior goal for Corinthians against América-RN. Marcelo Oliveira was injured in a Série A match against Grêmio on August 8, 2007, and was out for the rest of the 2007 season.

On February 4, 2013, Oliveira, in an exchange for Luan, signed for Palmeiras until the end of season.

Career statistics

Honours

Corinthians
Copa do Brasil: 2009

Palmeiras
Campeonato Brasileiro Série B: 2013

Grêmio
Copa do Brasil: 2016
Copa Libertadores: 2017
Recopa Sudamericana: 2018

References

1987 births
Living people
Sportspeople from Salvador, Bahia
Brazilian footballers
Association football defenders
Association football midfielders
Association football utility players
Campeonato Brasileiro Série A players
Campeonato Brasileiro Série B players
Sport Club Corinthians Paulista players
Paulista Futebol Clube players
Club Athletico Paranaense players
Cruzeiro Esporte Clube players
Sociedade Esportiva Palmeiras players
Grêmio Foot-Ball Porto Alegrense players